This is a list of foreign players in the Frauen-Bundesliga, which commenced play in 1990. The following players must meet both of the following two criteria:
Have played at least one Bundesliga game. Players who were signed by Frauen-Bundesliga clubs, but only played in lower league, cup and/or European games, or did not play in any competitive games at all, are not included. Players of 2. Frauen-Bundesliga clubs are also not included.
Are considered foreign, i.e., outside Germany determined by the following:
A player is considered foreign if she is not eligible to play for the national team of Germany.
More specifically,
If a player has been capped on international level, the national team is used; if she has been capped by more than one country, the highest level (or the most recent) team is used. These include German players with dual citizenship.
If a player has not been capped on international level, his country of birth is used, except those who were born abroad from German parents or moved to Germany at a young age, and those who clearly indicated to have switched her nationality to another nation.

Africa (CAF)

Equatorial Guinea 
Genoveva Añonman

Ghana 
Adjoa Bayor

Nigeria 
Patricia George

Asia (AFC)

Afghanistan 
Hailai Arghandiwal

Japan 
 Saki Kumagai

Philippines 
Sofia Harrison – Werder Bremen – 2022–

Europe (UEFA)

Austria 
Nicole Billa
Celina Degen
Barbara Dunst
Laura Feiersinger
Marina Georgieva
Julia Hickelsberger
Virginia Kirchberger
Lisa Kolb
Katharina Naschenweng
Sarah Puntigam
Sarah Zadrazil

Belarus 
Anna Sas

Belgium 
Tine De Caigny
Tessa Wullaert

Bosnia and Herzegovina 
Milena Nikolić

Croatia 
Ivana Rudelić

Denmark 
Karoline Smidt Nielsen

England 
 Mary Earps – Wolfsburg – 2018–2019
 Georgia Stanway – Bayern Munich – 2021–

Finland 
Tinja-Riikka Korpela
Essi Sainio
Katriina Talaslahti

Hungary 
 Zsanett Jakabfi
Petra Kocsán
Lilla Turányi

Iceland 
 Sveindís Jane Jónsdóttir
 Glódís Perla Viggósdóttir

Ireland 
 Amber Barrett

Israel 
Sharon Beck

Kosovo 
Erëleta Memeti

Netherlands 
Jill Baijings
Petra Hogewoning
Dominique Janssen
Desiree van Lunteren
Vivianne Miedema
Myrthe Moorrees
Jill Roord – Bayern Munich, Wolfsburg – 2017–2019, 2022–

Norway 
Nora Holstad Berge
Karina Sævik

Poland 
Katarzyna Kiedrzynek
Sylwia Matysik
Ewa Pajor
Tanja Pawollek 
Weronika Zawistowska

Russia 

Irina Grigorieva

Serbia 
Jovana Damnjanović

Slovakia 
Jana Vojteková – SC Freiburg – 2019–

Slovenia 
Sara Agrez
Adrijana Mori
Lara Prašnikar
Fata Salkunič

Sweden 
 Rebecka Blomqvist
 Hanna Glas

Switzerland 
Vanessa Bernauer
Luana Bühler
Svenja Fölmli
Lara Keller
Lara Marti
Géraldine Reuteler
Riola Xhemaili

Turkey 
Miray Cin

North and Central America, Caribbean (CONCACAF)

Jamaica 
 Beverly Ranger

Saint Kitts and Nevis 
Phoenetia Browne

United States 
 Katie Bethke
 Amber Brooks
 Jennie Clark
 Niki Cross
 Michelle Demko
 Sarah Hagen
 Chioma Igwe
 Taylor Kornieck
 Ali Krieger
 Gina Lewandowski
 Meaghan Nally
 Kristie Mewis
 India Trotter
 Erika Tymrak
 Ingrid Wells

Oceania (OFC)

New Zealand 
Abby Erceg

South America (CONMEBOL)

Brazil 
Ivana Fuso
 Letícia Santos
Tainara

Notes

References

Frauen-Bundesliga
Germany
Frauen-Bundesliga
Expatriate women's footballers in Germany
Association football player non-biographical articles